The boyfriend loophole is a gap in American gun legislation that allows access to guns by physically abusive ex-boyfriends and stalkers with previous convictions or restraining orders. While individuals who have been convicted of, or are under a restraining order for, domestic violence are prohibited from owning a firearm, the prohibition only applies if the victim was the perpetrator's spouse or cohabitant, or if the perpetrator had a child with the victim. The boyfriend loophole has had a direct effect on people who experience domestic abuse or stalking by former or current intimate partners. The Lautenberg Amendment of 1996 made stricter restrictions on gun control in the US; however, the definitions of "intimate partner" brought about this loophole. Several states tried closing it by legislation, but were generally not successful. However, new federal legislation, the Bipartisan Safer Communities Act, signed into law on June 25, 2022, significantly narrows the boyfriend loophole, denying access to firearms for five years (but not permanently) to people convicted of violence in dating relationships, but not for those with only restraining orders.

Background 
The prohibition imposed on individuals who have been convicted of domestic violence crimes and or for abuse, from buying and owning a gun is provided under current federal law in the United States. However, it only applies on the condition that the abuser was married to, and lived with, or conceived a child with the victim. Dating partners are not specifically listed under this law.

Connection between domestic abuse and stalking 
Studies show the connection between threats and stalking among partner abuse victims. The National Domestic violence hotline recorded data showing more than one in three callers report being threatened with a gun by their abuser, and more than three-fourths of domestic violence victims included in the study report being stalked by their ex-partner.

An analysis of mass shootings conducted by advocacy group Everytown for Gun Safety from 2009 to 2017 showed that at least 54% of incidents in which four or more people are shot and killed (excluding the shooter) depicted that the perpetrator shot a current or former intimate partner or family member.

A survey conducted in 2011 by the advocacy group Everytown for Gun Safety showed that more than half of women killed with guns were murdered by family members or intimate partners of both sexes. This was the case where guns existed in domestic violence homes and it was found that the risk for female homicide increased by an estimated 500%.

Lautenberg Amendment 

The primary legislation is the Gun Control Act of 1968 (CGA).  This is one of the United States federal laws that regulate firearm owners and the firearm industry.  The first effort to use the GCA to sift out individuals who were under court protective orders from accessing firearms occurred in 1994.  This provision, however, did not restrict alleged or convicted domestic violence abusers who continued to purchase guns for self-defense.  This prompted a second wave of amendment.  It is commonly known as the Lautenberg Amendment.

The Lautenberg Amendment was proposed by Senator Frank Lautenberg, a Democrat from New Jersey. On March 21, 1996, the United States Senate passed the bill as an amendment and President Clinton signed it into law four months later as a component of a federal omnibus spending bill. This law mandated that persons accused of committing violent acts against their own family members would effectively have their Second Amendment rights indefinitely suspended. The Senate voted almost unanimously. This law was an amendment to the existing felon-in-possession laws that forbade the possession or commercial sale of a firearm by convicted domestic violence abusers.

The amendment was intended to close an existing gap in the federal Gun Control Act of 1968 (GCA) directed towards domestic violence prosecutions, which were usually either charged as a misdemeanor or, as a result of a plea-bargain agreement was reduced from a felony to a misdemeanor. Testimony in support of the bill's passage was given by National Coalition Against Domestic Violence and the National Network to End Domestic Violence. Senator Lautenberg in his address repeated what a previous speaker said in that this bill he proposed “stands for the simple proposition that if you beat your wife, you should not have a gun".

States addressing the boyfriend loophole 
As of 2020, 19 states and Washington D.C. have taken up legislation to impose stricter controls than federal law does or did. These states have adopted laws prohibiting abusive dating partners, boyfriends or girlfriends who have been convicted of domestic violent crimes from possessing guns. Further, domestic violence restraining orders have been passed by 20 states and Washington D.C. Laws prohibiting stalkers from possessing guns have similarly been addressed by 19 states.

State gun restrictions 

Since 2013, 50 new laws have been passed with the objective of prohibiting guns from abusers by 28 states and Washington DC, however, 21 states have not prohibited abusers convicted of misdemeanor domestic violence crimes from obtaining and possessing guns.

New federal restrictions 
S. 2938, the Bipartisan Safer Communities Act, was passed by Congress and signed into law by President Biden in June 2022. It passed the Senate in a 65–33 vote with 15 Republican senators joining all 50 Democrats in support for the bill and was approved by the House of Representatives in a 234–193 vote with 14 House Republicans joining all 220 Democrats. The Act has significantly narrowed, but has not completely closed, the boyfriend loophole. Under the new law, someone convicted of a violent crime against someone with whom they are or recently were in a dating relationship is barred from having firearms. The length, nature, and types of interactions of the relationship are used to determine whether it is a dating relationship for the purposes of the Act. The wider provisions, however, expire after five years and never extend to dating partners subject to a restraining order but not convicted of a violent crime.

History of Constitutional challenges 
The Supreme Court has rejected arguments that domestic violence is potentially a violation of the Fourteenth Amendment's Due Process Clause. Its position is that the clause does not impose duty upon states to protect persons from injury caused by other private individuals. This position was amplified in Deshaney v. Winnebago County Department of Social Services, where the courts held that "(a) State's failure to protect an individual against private violence simply does not constitute a violation of the Due Process Clause". The Fourteenth Amendment rights of a 4-year-old child were not held to be violated after the child suffered near-fatal abuse that was alleged to have been partly the fault of the state's child protection agency. The Court held that the Constitution does not impose an obligation for the government to provide help, “even when such aid may be necessary to secure life, liberty, or property interests of which government itself may not deprive the individual.

This argument eventually developed to encompass the area of intimate partner violence in the case of Town of 

Castle Rock v. Gonzales. The Supreme Court found that no constitutional responsibility was imposed by the Fourteenth Amendment’s procedural Due Process Clause. In this case, failure by police to take action against Jessica Gonzales’ allegedly abusive husband, who was accused of violating a protective order by kidnapping the couple's children. The bodies of her deceased children were found that evening. Ms. Gonzales had called the police several times during the day to report the missing children, and she had visited the police station at least once to report the matter in person. Her husband later arrived at the Castle Rock police station and died in a shootout with officers there. The Courts held that the Colorado officials’ actions (or inaction) did not violate Ms. Gonzales’ constitutional rights.

Both rulings in Deshaney v. Winnebago County Department of Social Services and Town of Castle Rock v. Gonzales show that constitutionally enshrined individual rights do not protect an individual from harm by abusers due to action (or inaction) by the government. The implication is that constitutional challenges brought by alleged or convicted abusers claiming police action (inaction) directly resulting in abuse involving firearm from a boyfriend is likely to fail.

Surrendering of firearms 
The issue of enforceability of the existing law to protect victims of abuse from stalkers and convicted domestic abusers highlights the complexity of separating guns from abusive owners. The nexus between gun confiscation programs is advocated for in light of alarming rates of ex-spouse homicide victims. Reports published by The United States Department of Justice showed that firearms were involved in over two-thirds of ex-spouse homicide incidents over the period 1980 to 2008.

The boyfriend loophole discussion is relevant in the context of dating partners. Murders caused by dating partners almost equaled spousal homicides in 1980, the last year for which numbers are available. The Zero Tolerance for Domestic Abuse Act was introduced to Congress on January 15, 2019. The stated aim of bill was to define the term “intimate partner” to include dating partners and other persons for whom state domestic or family law is obligated to provide protection.

Current negotiations for closing the boyfriend loophole continue to face challenges in the House.  For example, the Violence Against Women Act (VAWA) was temporarily held up in the process of reauthorization in April 2019.  VAWA does not make it mandatory for state and local governments to develop a procedure for domestic violence abusers to surrender their firearms. However, the essential element is that the programs provided under this act continues to be funded.

The concerns raised in the House by Republicans concern the proposed lifetime ban on convicted misdemeanor charges on domestic abuse individuals and stalkers on firearm purchases. The public position of the National Rifle Association (NRA) is that this provision is an attempt to increase gun control by Democrats. The NRA is the oldest advocacy group in America and issued a “key vote” alert against the bill to members of Congress during the proceedings to warn that they may be scored and rated in NRA ratings as a result of their votes.

Despite the challenges in the legislature to address the “boyfriend loophole” issue, the program of gun confiscation and buybacks continues to achieve mixed results. This is noted in a 2017 research conducted by the Annals of internal Medicine which showed increase of gun surrender legislation directly reduced the rate of homicides from domestic violence, when certain extenuating circumstances were controlled for.

Arguments against gun surrender laws include both legal and policy approaches. Researchers have noted that gun surrender laws cast a net that is potentially too wide to survive a court challenge, and that “every domestic violence misdemeanor would not necessarily misuse a firearm against a (current of former intimate partner) if permitted to possess one. Data also show that females were “over 100 times more likely to be murdered by a man with a gun than to use it to kill a man in self-defense”. Safeguarding a home and personal defense are possible reasons why a survivor of domestic abuse may consider keeping her partner's firearm in the house.

Public survey 
Two national public surveys by GfK Knowledge Networks between the 2nd and 14 January 2013, applied equal probability sampling from a selected frame covering 97% of residential addresses in America. The aim of the survey was to find out the level of American support for gun restriction policies and was published in the New England Journal of Medicine (NEJM).  The survey indicated that of the 31 gun policies proposed, only 4 were not supported. The same survey indicates that 62% National Rifle Association (NRA) members also support policies which include preventing individuals convicted of domestic violence from owning a gun for 10 years, though legislative efforts to date have generally aimed at a lifetime ban.

See also
 Gun Control Act

References 

Gun politics
Law of the United States
Firearms
Intimate partner violence
Gun violence in the United States
Marriage, unions and partnerships in the United States